Kottige (also known as Megala Kottige) is a small village in the Holalkere town of Chitradurga State in Karnataka, India.

Regional

The total population of Kottige is less than 100. The village is bordered by Kabbala, Kelagina Kottige, Ugane Katte and Vaddara Hatti.

Tourism related

The village is famous for nearby Huli Katte (Tigers used to visit this pool regularly, hence the name 'Huli'), for its wildlife and the nearby picturesque hills. Hyenas and Wild Bears and wild boars frequently visit the village and nearby farms, in late evenings and nights. Untouched by the hands of human, the neighbouring hills provide a thrilling vista to the untamed beautiful fauna and flora of the Deccan Karnataka.

Visitors also flock the age old, Maari Gudi (Maari Shrine), which hosts Goddess Maari (of Maari Kanive) and attain the blessings of the Devi. During the village festival (Jaatre) held once in 12 years, Swaamana Kunita (Dance of 'Swama') provide a mindblowing perspective into the traditions and culture of ancient Dravidian Karnataka.

There is no bus route available into the village and the tourists have to get down at Ugane Katte Bus Stop or NG Halli Bus Stop between Hosadurga - Holalkere road and walk 4 miles thro' irrigated dense areca and coconut farms to reach the village.

Villages in Chitradurga district